Sam Hay is a chemist from New Zealand and a Reader in the Department of Chemistry at The University of Manchester. His research in general is based on computational chemistry and theoretical chemistry, specifically on the areas of In silico Enzymology, quantum mechanics roles in biological processes, kinetic modelling of complex reactions and high pressure spectroscopy.

Education 
Hay completed his Bachelor of Science degree in biochemistry in 2000 at University of Otago. He then joined the Australian National University for his Doctor of Philosophy degree and successfully completed it in 2004, and his work published in 2005. His PhD on Protein engineering of novel porphyrin/quinone-binding proteins for light-induced electron transfer was supervised by Prof. Thomas Wydrzynski.

Research and career 
Upon completing his PhD, Hay completed his postdoctoral research as a Wenner - Gren visiting Post Doctoral Fellow at Stockholm University where he spent time doing research on electrochemistry from 2004 to 2005. He then joined the University of Manchester and worked with Prof. Nigel Scrutton as a Post Doctoral Research Associate. In 2014, he became a Lecturer at the University of Manchester, and in 2017 promoted to the position of Senior Lecturer. In 2019,  he was promoted to the position of Reader.

Hay's research is generally based on computational chemistry and theoretical chemistry, specifically on the areas of In silico Enzymology, quantum mechanics roles in biological processes, kinetic modelling of complex reactions and high pressure spectroscopy.

Hay is the Undergraduate Admissions Tutor in the Department of Chemistry at The University of Manchester. He is also an undergraduate external physical chemistry examiner at University of Greenwich from 2019 - 2022. Hay was also the co-organiser of the MGMS ‘QM/MM methods and applications’ conference held in 2017.

Notable work 

In 2012, Hay and Nigel Scrutton published a paper on how vibrations may affect enzyme-catalyzed reactions. The paper provided an insight to motions which may reduce the size of the energy barrier along the reaction coordinate which may aid hydrogen-transfer reactions. The roles of these comprehensive motions and the understanding of the structural origins to these motions were not previously researched, and indirect experimental evidence and computational simulations were used to aid provide the insight into these good vibrations or motions.

In 2015, Hay also participated in research which first published a paper on a new, soluble, oxygen tolerant reductive dehalogenase enzyme. Organohalides in general contribute to a large proportion of environmental pollutants and the enzyme reductive dehalogenase is responsible for the biological dehalogenation in organohalide respiring bacteria. However, some of these enzymes are usually membrane associated and oxygen sensitive and therefore inhibits the process of dehalogenation, which the enzyme published upon was able to overcome.

Awards and nominations 
 BBSRC David Phillips fellowship (2010) 
 Rita and John Cornforth Award (2009)

Major publications

References

External links
  at University of Manchester

Living people
New Zealand chemists
Academics of the University of Manchester
21st-century chemists
University of Otago alumni
Australian National University alumni
Date of birth missing (living people)
Year of birth missing (living people)